The Itaboraian age is a period within the Early Eocene geologic time (53.0–50.0 Ma) epoch of the Paleogene, used more specifically with South American land mammal ages (SALMA). It follows the Riochican and precedes the Casamayoran age.

Etymology 
This age is named after the Itaboraí Formation in the Itaboraí Basin in Itaboraí, a Greater Rio municipality in the state of Rio de Janeiro in Brazil not very far away from Niterói.

Formations

Fossils

Correlations

References

Bibliography 
Itaboraí Formation
 
  
 
 
 
 

Bogotá Formation
 
 
 

Cerrejón Formation
 
 
 
 
 
 
 
 
 
 
 
 
 

Chota Formation
 
 

Las Flores Formation
 
 
 

Koluel Kaike Formation
 

Maíz Gordo Formation
 

Mogollón Formation
 
 

Muñani Formation
 

Peñas Coloradas Formation
  
 

Río Loro Formation
 

 
Paleocene South America
Paleogene Brazil
Tupi–Guarani languages